Çabiqi  is a settlement in the municipality of Kline, Kosovo.

It is the birthplace of Commander Mujë Krasniqi known by his nickname Kapuqi. Çabiqi borders with three other villages Caravik, Zabergjë and Ujmir.

See also
 Mujë Krasniqi
 List of settlers - Kline
 Sawn location in Çabiq
 Church of St. Nicholas (Çabiq)

Demographics 
 Çabiqi  has consistently had a majority ethnic Albanian population
Population during 1948-1991

Year - 1948: 390

Year - 1953 440

Year - 1961: 580

Year - 1971 714

Year - 1981: 956

Year - 1991: 1136

Notes

References

Villages in Klina